The National Police, formerly known as the , is one of two national police forces of France, the other being the National Gendarmerie. The National Police is the country's main civil law enforcement agency, with primary jurisdiction in cities and large towns. By contrast, the National Gendarmerie has primary jurisdiction in smaller towns, as well as in rural and border areas. The National Police comes under the jurisdiction of the Ministry of the Interior and has about 145,200 employees (as of 2015). Young French citizens can fulfill their mandatory service (Service national universel) in the police force.

The National Police operates mostly in cities and large towns. In that context, it conducts security operations such as patrols, traffic control and identity checks. Under the orders and supervision of investigating magistrates of the judiciary, it conducts criminal inquiries and serves search warrants. It also maintains specific services ('judicial police') for these inquiries.

Organization 
The National Police is commanded by the Director-General, who is currently Jean-Marc Falcone. The Director-General is personally in command of the General Directorate of the National Police (DGPN) and responsible to the Minister of the Interior.

The Préfet de Police, currently Didier Lallement, manages the Préfecture de Police de Paris that includes all police and security services in Paris, the three neighbouring departments of the 'la petite couronne''' region (Hauts-de-Seine, Seine-Saint-Denis and Val-de-Marne), and the airports of Roissy, Orly and Le Bourget. The Paris Police Prefecture is a separate law enforcement jurisdiction. While its officers belong to the National Police, their chief (the Police Prefect) acts completely independently from the Director-General of the National Police, reporting directly to the French Minister of the Interior. The elevated status of the Paris Police Prefect is also underlined by the fact that he/she is also head of the Île-de-France Defence and Serurity Zone (Zone de défense et de sécurité Île-de-France). The police forces in the other departments of the Île-de-France region are under the direct command of a Préfet (Department Prefect), being himself under the supervision of the Préfet de Police as far as the active on-the-field police work is concerned, and under the control of the Director-General for the rest.

The National Police is sub-divided into (central) directorates, which are further composed of sub-directorates:
 Direction des ressources et des compétences de la police nationale (Directorate of Resources and Competences of the National Police; DRCPN): formed from the fusion of the former Direction de la formation de police nationale (Directorate of Training of the National Police; DFPN) and Direction de l'administration de la police nationale (Directorate of Administration of the National Police; DAPN). It was established on 1 September 2010 and employs approximately 3 000 people.
 Direction centrale de la Police judiciaire (Central Directorate of the Judicial Police; DCPJ): charged with all criminal investigations under direction of magistrates. This mission is fulfilled in the Paris area by the Direction Régionale de Police Judiciaire de Paris which is nicknamed after its address "36 Quai des Orfèvres" (often without the number), and is a metonym for the Police generally; the national headquarters of the PJ, as it is usually called in French, are actually located at 11 rue des Saussaies, within the Ministry of the Interior). The main Sub-Directorates of the Judicial Police are: 
 Sous-direction anti-terroriste "SDAT" (Anti-Terrorism Sub-Directorate): elite counter-terrorist task-force.
 Sous-Direction de la lutte contre la criminalité organisée et la délinquance financière "SDLCODP" (Sub-Directorate for the struggle against organised crime and financial delinquency): Includes all the National Investigation Offices specialising in Organised and Financial Crime, except for the National Itinerant Criminality Struggle Office (which falls under the Gendarmerie Nationale)
 Sous-Direction de la police technique et scientifique "SDPTS" (Sub-directorate of forensics and crime scene investigation)
 Sous-Direction de lutte contre la cybercriminalité "SDLC" (Sub-directorate for the struggle against computer and internet crime)
 Direction centrale de la sécurité publique (Central Directorate of Public Security; DCSP): Patrol and response duties, misdemeanour investigations, emergency help; this Directorate comprises approximatively 80% of the workforce. The DCSP is the National Police's equivalent of the Departmental Gendarmerie.
Central apparatus (l'Échelon central)
92 départemental directorates in metropolitan France (sing. Direction Départementale de la Sécurité Publique (DDSP), followed by the département's number. For example the DDSP 62 is the Departement Public Security Directorate of Pas-de-Calais).
The three départements of the 'petit couronne' region (Seine-Saint-Denis, Hauts-de-Seine and Val-de-Marne) were absorbed into the Paris Police Prefecture by Presidential Decree No. 2009-898 of July 24, 2009 and fused into the Proximity Security Directorate of the Parisian Agglomeration (Direction de la Sécurité de Proximité de l'Agglomération Parisienne (DSPAP)), which includes four Proximity Security Territorial Directorates (sing. Direction Territoriale de Sécurité de Proximité (DTSP)): DTSP 75 for the city of Paris; DTSP 92 in Nanterre for Hauts-de-Seine; DTSP 93 in Bobigny for Seine-Saint-Denis and DTSP 94 in Créteil for Val-de-Marne.
7 overseas directorates: Guadeloupe, Martinique, Guyane, La Réunion, New Caledonia, French Polynesia and Mayotte.
 Direction centrale de la police aux frontières (Central Directorate of Border Police; DCPAF): performs identity checks with "La douane française" (official name: Direction générale des Douanes et Droits Indirects) and handles illegal immigration.
 Inspection générale de la police nationale (General Inspectorate of the National Police, IGPN): headed by the Inspector General and responsible for internal affairs. In the Paris Area, these tasks are assigned to a dedicated service—the Inspection Générale des Services (General Inspectorate of the Services).
 Direction centrale des compagnies républicaines de sécurité (Central Directorate of the Republican Security Companies; DCCRS): riot police, motorway police, and mountain rescue; commonly referred to as the CRS.
 Service de coopération technique internationale de police (Technical International Police Co-operation Service; SCTIP).
 Service de protection des hautes personnalités (Important Persons Protection Service; SPHP): VIP protection for people such as foreign diplomats and also responsible for the protection of the President of the French Republic through the 'Groupe de Sécurité de la Présidence de la République'.
 Recherche Assistance Intervention Dissuasion (Research, Assistance, Intervention, Deterrence; RAID) intervention unit. The elite counter-terror unit of the National Police and counterpart to the GIGN of the National Gendarmerie. The commander of RAID also doubles as the chief of the National Police Intervention Force (French abbreviation FIPN). The RAID is headquartered in Bièvres, Essonne, approximately 20 kilometres (12 miles) southwest of Paris. As it is on stand-by for deployment nationwide, the primary intervention unit for reaction in Paris is the Brigade anticommando (BRI-BAC) - the Research and Intervention Brigade of the Paris Police Prefecture's Judicial Police Regional Directorate. The function of the FIPN is that of a co-ordinating organ between the RAID and the BRI-BAC. The RAID used to operate closely with the UCLAT (Unité de Coordination de la Lutte Antiterroriste, Counterterror Coordination Unit). On December 27, 2019 the UCLAT was absorbed into the Direction Générale de la Sécurité Intérieure, the French domestic intelligence and security agency and the latter took over the close co-operation with the RAID.
Territorial Detachments. The Central Directorate of Public Security - the National Police's public order uniformed branch had its own tactical intervention units, the Groupes d'Intervention de la Police Nationale (Intervention Groups of the National Police (GIPN)).Between 2016 and 2019 these units were absorbed into the RAID as its territorial detachments (antennes RAID)
10 territorial detachments in metropolitan France: Bordeaux, Lille, Lyon, Marseille, Nice, Rennes, Strasbourg, Montpellier, Nancy and Toulouse;
3 territorial detachments in the French overseas territories: Nouméa in New Caledonia, Pointe-à-Pitre in Guadeloupe and Saint-Denis in Réunion.

 Former directorates 
As of 1 July 2008, the following two National Police directorates:
 Direction de la surveillance du territoire (Directorate of Territorial Surveillance; DST) – counter-intelligence, counterespionage, counterterrorism
 Direction centrale des renseignements généraux (Central Directorate of General Information; DCRG or RG) – police intelligence, records, research, analysis (and also policing gambling and horse racing, two activities which are now in the hands of the "Service central des courses et jeux" SCCJ, a unit of the Judicial Police)
were merged into one single domestic intelligence agency titled the Direction centrale du renseignement intérieur (DCRI). The DCRI was placed directly under the Ministry of the Interior.

 Ranks 

The National Police is divided into three corps, in the terminology of the French Civil Service, in ascending order of seniority:
 The  (Management and Enforcement Corps) corresponds approximately to the enlisted and non-commissioned ranks in a military force, or to constables and sergeants in a British-style civil police force.

 The  (Command Corps) corresponds approximately to the lower commissioned ranks of a military force, or the grades of inspector and chief inspector in a British-style civil police force. These ranks were previously known as  if detectives or  if uniformed, although CRS officers always used the current ranks.

 The  (Conception and Direction Corps) corresponds approximately to the higher commissioned ranks of a military force, or to grades of  Superintendent and chief officers in a British-style civil police force.

All the ranks insignia may be worn either on the shoulders or on the chest. In the latter they are square-shaped.

Prior to 1995 two civilian corps ("" and "") existed in which plainclothes officers were given the training and authority to conduct investigations. The closest American equivalent is the detective branch.

 Equipment 

 Weapons 

Prior to the Second World War and the formation of the Police Nationale, the French police used a variety of side arms, both revolvers and semi-automatic pistols, notably comprising the MAS 1873, the MAS 1892, the FN M1900, Ruby pistols, and a variety of privately purchased weapons.

Immediately after the Second World War, a variety of military side arms were issued, often captured weapons provided by the Army or French-produced German-designed weapons, such as the Mauser HSc or the Walther P38 for sidearms, and the Karabiner 98k rifle, to the now unified national force.

In 1951, a standardisation was performed on the RR 51 pistol in 7.65×17mm and on the MAS-38 and MAT-49 for submachine guns. From 1953, in the context of heightening violence of the Algeria War, CRS units were upgraded to the 9×19mm MAC Mle 1950.

In the early 1960s, large-caliber revolvers were introduced, culminating with the introduction of the Manurhin MR 73 and the Ruger SP101. In the 80s, a process to standardize revolvers was initiated. The 1970s also saw the introduction of automatic rifles and carbines (such as the SIG SG 543) to fend off heavily armed organised crime and terrorism.

In the 2000s, the police started switching to semi-automatic pistols and to the 9×19mm Parabellum cartridge. For some years, the standard sidearm in the National Police and the Gendarmerie Nationale was the PAMAS G1, which was French licensed and made. In 2003 both agencies made the biggest small arms contract since the Second World War for about 250,000 SIG Sauer Pro SP 2022s, a custom-tailored variant of the SIG Pro, replacing the PAMAS-G1 and several other pistols in service. The weapons are planned to stay in service until the year 2022, hence the weapon name. The police purchased more pistols in late 2018 possibly indicating they intend them to be used beyond 2022.

For greater threats the police use slightly modified Ruger Mini-14s purchased in the 1970s. More modern long guns like Remington 870, HK UMP and HK G36 are also issued.

Some sources have claimed the use of the Spectre M4 by the French National Police.

 Cars 
While the vast majority of vehicles are screen printed French brand (mainly Renault, Citroën and Peugeot), some service vehicles are provided by Ford and Opel. Plainclothes officers or specialised branches use vehicles from a variety of manufacturers.

Pictures

 In popular culture 
 Television series 
 Maigret (various television series)
 The Last Five Minutes (Les cinq dernières minutes) (1958–1996)
 Navarro  (1989–2005)
 Commissaire Moulin (1976–2006)
 Police Judiciaire/P.J. (1997–2009)
 La Crim' (1999–2006)
 Commissaire Magellan (2009–)
 Les Cordier juge et flic (1992–2003)
 Commissaire Cordier  (2004–2007)
 Julie Lescaut  (1991–2014)
 Falco (2013–2016)
 Commissaire Valence (2002–2008)
 Engrenages  (2005-)
 Profilage (2009-2020)
 The Crimson Rivers (Les Rivières Pourpres'') (2018-2020)

See also 
 Law enforcement in France

References

Further reading

External links 

 Official site of the French National Police 
 Official site of the French Ministry of Interior 
 Unofficial site of the National Police 

 
National Central Bureaus of Interpol
National law enforcement agencies of France
France